Clifford Nii Boi Tagoe,  (born 6 October 1949) is a Ghanaian academic who is the former Vice Chancellor of the University of Ghana. He has been teaching anatomy for over 25 years in Ghana and abroad and in 2000 he became Professor of Anatomy and Dean at the University of Ghana Medical School. In 2005, he became acting vice chancellor of the university. He served for five years and was succeeded in 2010 by Ernest Aryeetey.

Education
Tagoe was born in Accra, Ghana. After his Common Entrance Examination at Richard Akwei Memorial School, he gained admission to St Augustine's College in Cape Coast, where he studied for his 'O'- and 'A'-Level examinations. Professor Tagoe holds a bachelor's degree in Medicine and Surgery (MB., ChB.) from the University of Ghana and PhD in Anatomy (1983) from the University of Leicester, UK.

Career
Professor Clifford Nii Boi Tagoe is a past Vice-Chancellor of the University of Ghana, a position he held from October, 2006 to July, 2010.  Prior to this he held office as Dean of the University of Ghana Medical School and also Provost of the College of Health Sciences of the University of Ghana.   Over the years, he has served on numerous Boards and Committees of the university, and was a member of the University Council between 1995 and 1997.

As Vice-Chancellor, he attended several Higher Education Conferences and presented papers on topics including "Provision and Financing of Higher Education in Africa", "Some Aspects of Intra- and Inter-Regional Cooperation in Africa" and "International Code of Ethics for Higher Education".

He was the current President of the Anatomical Society of West Africa, a Member of the Council of the Association of Commonwealth Universities and a member of the Administrative Board of the International Association of Universities.

In 2008, the Government of Ghana conferred on him the national honour of the Order of the Volta, for services to higher education in Ghana.

References

1949 births
Living people
Alumni of the University of Leicester
Ga-Adangbe people
Vice-Chancellors of the University of Ghana
Recipients of the Order of the Volta
University of Ghana alumni
St. Augustine's College (Cape Coast) alumni
Academic staff of the University of Ghana Medical School
University of Ghana Medical School alumni